Líbano is a district of the Tilarán canton, in the Guanacaste province of Costa Rica.

Geography 
Líbano has an area of  km² and an elevation of  metres.

Locations 
Poblados: Alto Cartago, Maravilla, San José, Solania

Demographics 

For the 2011 census, Líbano had a population of  inhabitants.

Transportation

Road transportation 
The district is covered by the following road routes:
 National Route 925

References 

Districts of Guanacaste Province
Populated places in Guanacaste Province